Sandra Kinza (born 1 August 1969) is a German ice hockey player. She competed in the women's tournament at the 2002 Winter Olympics.

References

External links
 

1969 births
Living people
German women's ice hockey players
Olympic ice hockey players of Germany
Ice hockey players at the 2002 Winter Olympics
People from Unna
Sportspeople from Arnsberg (region)
21st-century German women